A. J. Croce is the self-titled debut album by American singer-songwriter A. J. Croce, released in 1993.

Track listing
All songs written by A.J. Croce, except where noted

"He's Got a Way with Women" (Rodney Lay, Hank Thompson) – 3:31
"Which Way Steinway" – 3:21
"I Wonder" (Cecil Gant, Raymond Leveen) – 5:01
"How'd We Get So Good at Sayin' Good-Bye" – 4:06
"I Found Faith" – 2:45
"Keep on Lookin'" – 4:09
"She Wouldn't Give Me None" (Minnie McCoy, Joe McCoy) – 3:15
"I Know Better Now" – 3:11
"Back Where I Began" – 3:00
"Smokin' Good Time" – 3:15
"Stuff You Gotta Watch" (Tom Dowd, Dan Greer, George Jackson) – 2:32
"If I Could Be with You (One Hour Tonight)" (Henry Creamer, James P. Johnson) – 2:03

Personnel
A. J. Croce – piano, vocals
Bob Boss – electric guitar
Garnett Brown – trombone
T-Bone Burnett – acoustic guitar
Armando Campion – acoustic bass
Ron Carter – bass, acoustic bass
Evan Christopher – clarinet, tenor saxophone
Armando Compion – bass, electric bass
Dave Curtis – electric bass
Tim Drummond – electric bass
Sally Dworsky – background vocals
Chuck Findley – trumpet
Robben Ford – acoustic guitar, guitar, electric guitar
Gary Herbig – baritone saxophone
Dick Hyde – tuba
Jim Keltner – drums
Paul Kimbarow – drums
Mitch Manker & his Brass Section – trumpet
Arnold McCuller – background vocals
Carolyn Perry – background vocals
Lori Perry – background vocals
Sharon Perry – background vocals
Greg Prestopino – background vocals
Bill Reichenbach, Jr. – trombone, bass trombone
Jim Self – tuba
Paco Shipp – harmonica, tenor saxophone
John Simon – conductor
Fred Tackett – acoustic guitar, dobro
Benmont Tench – organ
Snooky Young – flugelhorn

Production
Producers: T-Bone Burnett, John Simon
Engineers: Steve MacMillan, Joe Schiff, Allen Sides
Assistant engineers: Jim Champagne, Noel Hazen
Mastering: Chris Bellman
Production coordination: Joe Henry
Arrangers: Evan Christopher, Mitch Manker & his Brass Section, John Simon
Art direction: Melanie Penny
Design: Kurt DeMunbrun
Photography: William Claxton

A. J. Croce albums
1993 debut albums
Albums produced by John Simon (record producer)
Albums produced by T Bone Burnett